George Randall may refer to:
 George Randall (RAF officer) (1899–?), British World War I flying ace
 George Randall (politician) (1832–1908), businessman and politician in Ontario, Canada
 George Morton Randall (1841–1918), U.S. Army officer
 George M. Randall (bishop) (1810–1873), Episcopal bishop
 George Randall (actor) (1895–1955), Australian actor